Nangkor Gewog (Dzongkha: ནང་སྐོར་) is a gewog (village block) of Zhemgang District, Bhutan.

References

Gewogs of Bhutan
Zhemgang District